Heritage Hall School is a coeducational, college-prep school located in North Oklahoma City, Oklahoma.   An independent private school not affiliated with any religious organization, the school is open to students of any race, religion, nationality, or ethnic origin.

Heritage Hall was founded in 1969 in the church basement of First Christian Church.   Heritage Hall was founded during the integration of Oklahoma City public schools as a segregation academy.

Heritage Hall serves children from preschool through 12th grade, and has about 900 students.  Racial diversity in the student body closely matches the Oklahoma state average, with an enrollment of just over 20% of students of color.  Each grade in the Upper School has about 90 students.

Heritage Hall is accredited by the Independent Schools Association of the Southwest, and is a member of the National Association of Independent Schools. The current headmaster, Aaron Fetrow, was appointed in 2021.

Heritage Hall's athletic teams are nicknamed the Chargers.  The school colors are navy blue and Gold.  As a member of the Oklahoma Secondary School Activities Association, middle school and high school students are able to participate in about a dozen competitive sports, from American football to tennis, basketball, swimming, golf, soccer, baseball and softball. 
The motto is "To Learn, To Lead, To Serve."  Heritage Hall's institutional core values are:  moral courage, personal responsibility, active kindness, and intellectual purpose.  The school symbol is a torch that burns with the letters HH.

Until 2015, Heritage Hall and Casady School held rivalries against one another.

State Championships
Heritage Hall has 91 total state championships in eleven sports.

During the 2017–2018 school year Heritage Hall won the state championship in 5 different sports (the most of any school in Oklahoma that year):  Football, Boys Basketball, Boys Tennis, Girls Tennis, and Boys Golf.

Similarly, during the 2014–2015 school year Heritage Hall won the state championship in 7 different sports (the most of any school in Oklahoma that year):  Football, Boys Basketball, Baseball, Boys Golf, Boys Tennis, Girls Tennis and Volleyball.

Boys Basketball (2) - 2015, 2018

Baseball (4)– 1999, 2015, 2016, 2021

Cheerleading (4)– 1999, 2000, 2001, 2015

Football (8)– 1998, 2008, 2010, 2014, 2015, 2017, 2018, 2022

Boys Golf (14)– 1976, 1977, 1986, 1987, 1996, 2008, 2010, 2012, 2014, 2015, 2017, 2018, 2019, 2022

Slow Pitch Softball (1)– 1997

 Boys Soccer (3)– 2013, 2014, 2016

Boys Tennis (21)– 1978, 1979, 1980, 1981, 1987, 1990, 1991, 1992, 1993, 1994, 1995, 1997, 1998, 2011, 2012, 2014, 2015, 2016, 2017, 2018, 2019

Girls Tennis (23)- 1980, 1982, 1983, 1985, 1986, 1987, 1988, 1989, 1991, 1992, 1994, 1995, 1996, 1999, 2000, 2001, 2003, 2009, 2010, 2011, 2012, 2015, 2018

Boys Track(4)– 1987, 1988, 1997, 2017

Volleyball(10)− 1992, 1994, 1995, 1996, 2005, 2006, 2007, 2008, 2013, 2014

Heritage Hall also holds 18 state championships in policy debate, most recently in 2018. In June 2020, Heritage Hall's Saif-Ullah Salim and Samuel Ring won the National Speech & Debate Tournament in the policy debate division, regarded as the policy debate national championship.

Notable alumni
Graham Colton '00, is a singer/songwriter best known for his hit single "Best Days"
Aubrey McClendon '77, founder and CEO of Chesapeake Energy
Barry J. Sanders '12, college football running back, played for the Stanford Cardinal and Oklahoma State Cowboys and also the son of College Football and Pro Football Hall of Famer Barry Sanders. Sanders now holds a leadership position with the Electronic Arts (EA) Madden NFL Partnership.
Anthony Shadid '86, two-time winner of the Pulitzer Prize and foreign correspondent for the New York Times 
Sterling Shepard '12, WR who played college football for the Oklahoma Sooners and currently plays for the New York Giants of the NFL
Mike Turner '05, politician in the Oklahoma House of Representatives
Wes Welker '00, current assistant coach for the Miami Dolphins, five-time NFL Pro Bowl wide receiver for the San Diego Chargers, Miami Dolphins, New England Patriots, Denver Broncos and St. Louis Rams; appeared in three Super Bowls with the Patriots and Broncos; also played college football for the Texas Tech Red Raiders
Helen Park '21, Played on South Korea's National U19 lacrosse team in the 2019 U19 lacrosse world cup. First female division one lacrosse athlete from Oklahoma.

References

External links
 

Independent Schools Association of the Southwest
Educational institutions established in 1969
Private high schools in Oklahoma
Private middle schools in Oklahoma
Private elementary schools in Oklahoma
Schools in Oklahoma City
Preparatory schools in Oklahoma
1969 establishments in Oklahoma